State Highway 334 (SH 334)  is a  state highway in the U.S. state of Texas.  The highway begins at a junction with State Highway 274 (SH 274) in Seven Points and heads east to a junction with U.S. Highway 175 (US 175) in Gun Barrel City.

History
SH 334 was originally designated on September 25, 1939, as a route from Freeport southward to Bryan Beach. This route was cancelled on August 27, 1959, along with SH 333, due to the completion of FM 1495.
SH 334 was redesignated in 1989 as a renumbering of a portion of FM 85 to serve as a route between Seven Points and Gun Barrel City.

Route description
SH 334 begins  at a junction with SH 274 in Seven Points.  It heads east from this junction across the Cedar Creek Reservoir to an intersection with SH 198 in Gun Barrel City.  SH 334 reaches its eastern terminus at US 175 in Gun Barrel City.

Junction list

References

334
Transportation in Henderson County, Texas